Phridon Gigani (born 2 March 1993) is a Georgian judoka.

He is the silver medallist of the 2018 Judo Grand Prix Tbilisi in the -73 kg category.

References

External links
 

1993 births
Living people
Male judoka from Georgia (country)